Newton Township may refer to:

Arkansas 
 Newton Township Faulkner County, Arkansas, in Faulkner County, Arkansas

Illinois 
 Newton Township, Whiteside County, Illinois

Indiana 
 Newton Township, Jasper County, Indiana

Iowa 
 Newton Township, Buchanan County, Iowa
 Newton Township, Carroll County, Iowa
 Newton Township, Jasper County, Iowa
 Newton Township, Winnebago County, Iowa

Kansas 
 Newton Township, Harvey County, Kansas

Michigan 
 Newton Township, Calhoun County, Michigan
 Newton Township, Mackinac County, Michigan

Minnesota 
 Newton Township, Otter Tail County, Minnesota

Missouri 
 Newton Township, Shannon County, Missouri

New Jersey 
 Newton Township, Camden County, New Jersey
 Newton Township, Sussex County, New Jersey

North Carolina 
 Newton Township, Catawba County, North Carolina, in Catawba County, North Carolina

Ohio 
 Newton Township, Licking County, Ohio
 Newton Township, Miami County, Ohio
 Newton Township, Muskingum County, Ohio
 Newton Township, Pike County, Ohio
 Newton Township, Trumbull County, Ohio

Pennsylvania 
 Newton Township, Lackawanna County, Pennsylvania

See also 
 Newtown Township (disambiguation)

Township name disambiguation pages